Primus inter pares is a Latin phrase meaning first among equals. It is typically used as an honorary title for someone who is formally equal to other members of their group but is accorded unofficial respect, traditionally owing to their seniority in office.

Historically, the princeps senatus of the Roman Senate was such a figure and initially bore only the distinction that he was allowed to speak first during debate. Also, Constantine the Great was given the role of primus inter pares. However, the term is also often used ironically or self-deprecatingly by leaders with much higher status as a form of respect, camaraderie or propaganda. After the fall of the Republic, Roman emperors initially referred to themselves only as princeps despite having enormous power.

Various modern figures such as the chair of the United States Federal Reserve System, the prime minister of parliamentary countries, the President of Switzerland, the Chief Justice of the US Supreme Court, the Chief Justice of the Philippines, the Archbishop of Canterbury of the Anglican Communion and the Ecumenical Patriarch of Constantinople of the Eastern Orthodox Church fall under both senses: bearing higher status and various additional powers while remaining still merely equal to their peers in important senses.

National use

China
In the People's Republic of China, which was placed under the collective leadership of the Politburo Standing Committee following the death of Chairman Mao Zedong, the term "first among equals" was often used to describe China's paramount leader at the zenith of Deng Xiaoping's influence. This has fallen out of favour since the consolidation of power under the current core leader, General Secretary Xi Jinping.

Commonwealth usage

Prime minister or premier
In the federal Commonwealth realms, Canada and Australia, in which King Charles III is head of state as constitutional monarch, a governor-general is appointed by the King-in-Council to represent the King during his absence. The governor-general typically appoints the leader of the political party holding at least a plurality of seats in the elected legislature to be prime minister, whose relationship with the other ministers of the Crown is in theory said to be that of a primus inter pares, or "first among equals". This is also done at the provincial or state level wherein the lieutenant governors of the Canadian provinces or governors of the Australian states as Lieutenant-Governor-in-Council appoints the leader of the provincial or state political party holding at least a plurality of seats in the elected provincial or state legislature to be provincial premier or state premier.

Viceroys in Canada and Australia
As federations in Canada, lieutenant-governors represent the Canadian monarch in each of the provinces, thus, acting as the "heads of state" in the provinces. Unlike in Australia with the governors of the Australian states, the lieutenant-governors in Canada are not appointed by the King-in-Council, but by the governor general on the advice of the prime minister of Canada known as the Governor-in-Council. Similarly, in Australia, there are governors to represent the Australian monarch in each of the states of Australia that comprise the federal Commonwealth of Australia, making them "head of state" in each of their own states. In each case, these several governors or lieutenant-governors are not envisaged as subordinate to the governor general – the governor-general of Australia and the governor general of Canada – as a federal viceroy – is "first among equals".

Germany
Mayors of German city states have traditionally acted as primus inter pares. In Hamburg, Lübeck and Bremen, which had been Free Imperial Cities from the times of the Holy Roman Empire, the government was called Senate. The mayor was one senator amongst many, often referred to as president of the Senate rather than mayor. This ended in Lübeck with the incorporation into Prussia in 1937. While in a constitutional reform in 1996, the mayor of Hamburg was given broad powers to shape the politics of the Senate of Hamburg, thus, ending his status as primus inter pares. However, in the city state Free Hanseatic City of Bremen which was created after the Second World War, the mayor has had a similar role in the Senate of Bremen. The same was true until 1995 for the governing mayor of Berlin among his colleagues within the Senate of Berlin.

Japan
Starting with the Meiji Constitution of 1885, as part of the "Cabinet System Act", and lasting until the revision of the modern constitution in 1947, the prime minister of Japan was legally considered to be of the same rank as the other ministers who formed the Cabinet. During this time, the prime minister was referred to as "同輩中の首席" dōhai-chū no shuseki ("chief among peers").

Netherlands
The prime minister of the Netherlands (officially, the "minister-president") is the chairman of the Council of Ministers and active executive authority of the Dutch government. Although formally no special powers are assigned, the prime minister functions as the "face" of the cabinet of the Netherlands. Usually, the prime minister is also minister of General Affairs. Until 1945, the position of chairman of the Council of Ministers officially switched between the ministers, although practices differed throughout history. In 1945, the position was formally instituted. Although not formally necessary, the prime minister in practice is the leader of the largest party in the majority coalition in the House of Representatives, the lower house of parliament.

Singapore
The phrase "first among equals" is often used to describe the political succession within the ruling People's Action Party leadership and future candidate for the prime minister of Singapore.

Switzerland

In Switzerland, the seven-member Federal Council constitutes the government. Each year, the Federal Assembly elects a president of the Confederation. By convention, the positions of President and Vice President rotate annually, each Councillor thus becoming Vice President and then President every seven years while in office.

The president is not the Swiss head of state, but is the highest-ranking Swiss official. The president presides over Council meetings and carries out certain representative functions that, in other countries, are the business of the head of state. In urgent situations where a Council decision cannot be made in time, the president is empowered to act on behalf of the whole Council. Apart from that, though, the president is a primus inter pares, having no power above and beyond the other six councillors.

United Kingdom

The term "prime minister" can be compared to "primary minister" or "first minister".  Because of this, the prime ministers of many countries are traditionally considered to be "first among equals" – they are the chairman or "head" of a Cabinet rather than holding an office that is de jure superior to that of ministers.

The Prime Minister of the United Kingdom has frequently been described as "first among equals". In the UK, the executive is the Cabinet, and during Hanoverian times a minister had the role of informing the monarch about proposed legislation in the House of Commons and other matters. In modern times, however, although the phrase is still occasionally used, it understates the powers of the prime minister, which now include many broad, exclusive, executive powers over which cabinet members have little influence.

First Among Equals is the title of a popular political novel (1984) by Jeffrey Archer, about the careers and private lives of several men vying to become British Prime Minister. It was later adapted into a ten-part TV series, produced by Granada Television.

Countries and jurisdictions that have adapted the British parliamentary system (such as Canada and Australia) would have the same use for the phrase.

United States

The phrase "first among equals" has also been used to describe the Chief Justice of the United States.

The Chief Justice has no authority over the decisions of the other Justices, but holds one key administrative power: when the Chief Justice votes with the majority on a decision, he can either author the majority opinion himself or assign it to another Justice voting with the majority.

Chairmen 
In many private parliamentary bodies, such as clubs, boards, educational faculty, and committees, the officer or member who holds the position of chair or chairman is often regarded as a "first among equals". That is, while most rules of order will grant the chair special powers within the context of a meeting, the position of chair is usually temporary, rotating, and powerless in other contexts, making the occupant merely a temporary leader required to instil order. This is the case for mayors under a council–manager government, as the "mayor" has the same vote as all other council members and cannot override them, although their opinion may have more sway among other members.

Religion

Eastern Orthodox Church 

The phrase "first among equals" is also used to describe the role of the patriarch of Constantinople, who, as the "ecumenical patriarch", is the first among all the bishops of the Eastern Orthodox Church. He has no direct jurisdiction over the other patriarchs or the other autocephalous Orthodox churches and cannot interfere in the election of bishops in autocephalous churches, but he alone enjoys the right of convening extraordinary synods consisting of them or their delegates to deal with ad hoc situations, and he has also convened well-attended pan-Orthodox Synods in the last forty years. His title is an acknowledgement of his historic significance and of his privilege to serve as primary spokesman for the Eastern Orthodox Communion. His moral authority is highly respected.

The Eastern Orthodox Church also uses the term "first among equals" in regard to the bishop of Rome during the first thousand years of Christianity. Whereas the patriarch of Constantinople is now considered first among the Orthodox patriarchs, the Orthodox Church considers the bishop of Rome (regarded as the "patriarch of the West") the "first among equals" in the Pentarchy of the patriarchal sees according to the ancient, first millennial order (or "taxis" in Greek) of Rome, Constantinople, Alexandria, Antioch, and Jerusalem, established after Constantinople became the eastern capital of the Byzantine Empire. The bishop of Rome no longer holds this distinction in the Orthodox Church because, following the East–West Schism, he is no longer in communion with the Orthodox Church.

The canons relative to the universal primacy of honor of the patriarch of Constantinople are the 9th canon of the synod of Antioch and the 28th canon of the Council of Chalcedon.

Catholic Church 

The Latin and Eastern Catholic Churches consider the pope (bishop of Rome) to be the single Vicar of Christ, successor of Saint Peter, and leader of all their bishops (Patriarchs included), in Apostolic succession to the apostles. As such, the Catholic Church does not see the pope merely as being "first among equals", but as actually holding an office with supreme authority in canon law over all other bishops. This jurisdictional claim was one of the main causes of the East-West Schism in the Church, which became formal in 1054.
 
In the Catholic Church, the Dean of the College of Cardinals is the first among equal Prince of the Church in the College, which is the pope's highest-ranking council and elects the papal successor, generally from its own ranks.

Various episcopal sees were granted or claim the title of primate (usually of a past or present political entity), which grants such a primas (usually a metropolitan archbishopric, often in a former/present capital) precedence over all other sees in its circumscription, outranking (other) metropolitan sees, but the incumbent primates can be trumped by personal ranks, as they rank below cardinals. More commonly, dioceses are geographically grouped in an ecclesiastical province, where only one holds the rank of metropolitan archbishop, which outranks his colleagues, who are therefore called his suffragans, even if these include (fairly rarely) another archbishop.

Anglican Communion 
According to the Anglican Covenant, the archbishop of Canterbury is "first among equals" in his presidency over the Anglican Communion. The senior bishop of the seven diocesan bishops of the Scottish Episcopal Church bears the truncated title primus from primus inter pares. Leading bishops or primates in other Anglican 'national' churches are often said to be primus inter pares within their provinces (e.g. Church of Ireland), while the (first) primatial see of Canterbury remains primus among them.

However, on 20 February 2023, the Global South Fellowship of Anglican Churches declared the Archbishop of Canterbury had lost its mantle of first among equals due to him accepting the Church of England's incorporation into the Anglican liturgy of blessings of same-sex unions.

The International Anglican-Catholic Commission for Unity and Mission, in its 2007 agreed statement Growing Together in Unity and Mission, "urge[s] Anglicans and Catholics to explore together how the ministry of the Bishop of Rome might be offered and received in order to assist our Communions to grow towards full, ecclesial communion".

Presbyterianism
The Moderator of the General Assembly in a Presbyterian church is similarly designated as a primus inter pares. This concept holds also for the Moderators of each Synod, Presbytery, and Kirk Session. As all elders are ordained – some for teaching and some for ruling – none sit in higher status, but all are considered equal behind the one and only head of the church Jesus Christ.

Church of Sweden
In the Lutheran Church of Sweden, the Archbishop of Uppsala is considered by the church as primus inter pares. As such, the Archbishop of Uppsala has no powers over the other 13 bishops but has some additional administrative and spiritual duties, as specified in the Church Order of the Church of Sweden.

According to the chapter 8 of the Church Order, only the Archbishop of Uppsala can ordain a bishop. The other bishops of the Church of Sweden are peers, not superior, to the Archbishop of Uppsala. Among the Archbishop of Uppsala's other duties is the obligation to convene and chair the Episcopal Assembly. Unlike the other bishops, who are elected to office by members of their diocese, the Archbishop of Uppsala is elected by the entire body of the church. There is a peculiar regulation that stipulates that the total votes cast in the archdiocese of Uppsala, when electing an archbishop, "shall be divided by ten, with decimals removed", before being added to the national vote.

See also 
 Egalitarianism
 Republicanism
 Animal Farm

Notes

Footnotes

References 

Latin political words and phrases
Titles
Primates (bishops)
Christian terminology
Roman Senate